Perth Hockey Stadium is Western Australia's premier hockey facility, with two world-class synthetic turf pitches, a large bar and canteen area and a function centre all available to the public. The venue holds up to 6,000 fans.

The Perth Hockey Stadium (PHS) is located at the Curtin University in the south eastern suburb of Bentley, Western Australia.
       
PHS played host to the 1985 Champions Trophy and also the 2002 Women's Hockey World Cup.  In recent years PHS hosted several Internationals matches and the very successful International 9's Super Series in 2011 and 2012.
The stadium is home to the offices of Hockey WA and the Hockey Australia High Performance Programme (including the Hockeyroos and the Kookaburras). Until the end of 2012 the Western Australian Institute of Sport (WAIS) hockey programme was based at PHS.

References
Perth Hockey Stadium at austadiums.com

Field hockey venues in Australia
Sports venues in Perth, Western Australia
Multi-purpose stadiums in Australia
Field hockey in Western Australia